Shaun of the Dead is a 2004 zombie comedy film directed by Edgar Wright and written by Wright and Simon Pegg. Pegg stars as Shaun, a downtrodden salesman in London who is caught in a zombie apocalypse with his friend Ed (Nick Frost). The film co-stars Kate Ashfield, Lucy Davis, Dylan Moran, Bill Nighy, and Penelope Wilton. It is the first installment in the Three Flavours Cornetto trilogy, followed by Hot Fuzz (2007) and The World's End (2013).

Shaun of the Dead developed from ideas Pegg and Wright used for their television series Spaced, particularly an episode where Pegg's slacker character hallucinates a zombie invasion. The film references the Dead films directed by George A. Romero. Principal photography took place across London and at Ealing Studios between May and June 2003.

The film premiered in London on 29 March 2004 and was theatrically released in the United Kingdom on 9 April 2004 and in the United States on 24 September. It was met with acclaim and commercial success, grossing $30 million worldwide on a budget of $6.1 million and receiving two nominations at the British Academy Film Awards. It was ranked third on the Channel 4 list of the 50 Greatest Comedy Films and quickly acquired a cult following. In film studies, the film is seen as a product of post-9/11 anxiety, as well as a model for transnational comedy. The spread of zombiism in the film has been used as a modelling example for disease control.

Plot 

In Crouch End, London, 29-year-old electronics salesman Shaun has no direction in his life. He is disrespected by his colleagues, does not get along with his stepfather, Philip, and is dumped by his girlfriend, Liz, after he fails to make decent plans for a date to celebrate their three-year anniversary. Heartbroken, Shaun gets drunk with Ed, his weed-dealing slacker best friend, at their favourite pub, the Winchester. At home, Shaun and Ed's flatmate Pete complains of a bite wound from a mugger and berates Shaun into getting his life together.

By morning, a zombie apocalypse has overwhelmed London. Shaun and Ed are slow to notice until they encounter two zombies in their garden, whom they beat to death with a shovel and cricket bat (after several failed attempts throwing household implements and Shaun's record collection). They devise a plan to rescue Liz and Barbara, Shaun's mother, and then wait out the crisis in the Winchester. They escape from a now-zombified Pete in Pete's car and pick up Philip, who has been bitten, and Barbara. After Ed deliberately crashes Pete's car, they use Philip's Jaguar to pick up Liz and her flatmates, David and Dianne. Philip reconciles with Shaun before Philip becomes a zombie.

Forced to abandon the car and their weapons, the group sneak through their London neighbourhood, running into a group led by Shaun's friend, Yvonne. Shaun defends Barbara from a zombie, which he is forced to impale with a swingball pole. After imitating zombies to get through a horde and reach the Winchester, Shaun and Ed argue after Ed answers his mobile phone, attracting the zombies' attention. After David panickedly breaks a window to gain access to the Winchester, Shaun is forced to lure them away using himself as bait. After the group takes refuge inside the Winchester, Shaun discovers that the zombies followed him, and Ed unwittingly attracts them by playing on the pub's fruit machine. Whilst fighting the zombified landlord, Shaun discovers that the Winchester rifle above the bar is functional. Barbara reveals she was bitten, and dies after giving Liz and Shaun's relationship her approval. David attempts to shoot Barbara, but Shaun stops him, causing the group to argue. Shaun accuses David of hating him and being in love with Liz, which Dianne admits she knows is true. Shaun, distraught, is forced to shoot Barbara when she becomes a zombie. Further fighting ensues after David states that Shaun was right to shoot Barbara.

Zombies break into the pub and devour David. Dianne rushes into the horde brandishing David's detached leg, opening a door and allowing it to enter. The zombified Pete appears and bites Ed, and Shaun shoots and kills Pete. Shaun, Liz, and Ed take cover behind the bar, which Shaun sets ablaze; the shells left on the bar ignite, killing several zombies by chance. The three take refuge in the cellar, where, realising they only have two bullets left, Shaun and Liz contemplate suicide while Ed elects to be devoured by the zombies. Shaun discovers a keg lift that opens out onto the street, and Ed volunteers to stay with the rifle as the zombies break in. The British Army arrive with Yvonne in tow, gun down the horde, and take Shaun and Liz to safety.

Six months later, civilisation has returned to normal, and surviving zombies are used as cheap labour and entertainment. Liz has moved in with Shaun, and Shaun keeps the zombified Ed tethered in his shed, where they play video games together.

Cast

Production

Conception and writing

Shaun of the Dead was developed from an episode of Simon Pegg and Edgar Wright's sitcom Spaced. The episode, "Art", which was written by Pegg with Jessica Stevenson and directed by Wright, sees Pegg's character under the influence of amphetamine and playing the video game Resident Evil 2, hallucinating that he is fighting off a zombie invasion.

With a mutual appreciation for George A. Romero's Dead trilogy of zombie films, Pegg and Wright decided to write their own zombie film. They conceived it in late 1999 and pitched it to Film4, who took it on until their production budget was cut back. Wright was still invested in production and refused to take television directing jobs until Shaun of the Dead was made, which left him in some debt for a while. Other companies passed on it, according to Wright, "Because they weren't sure what the tone was and said it wasn't all that scary and not that funny. They didn't get it." After eighteen months, Working Title Films picked it up, which Wright felt was ironic as the film mocks the classic British rom-coms that Working Title makes. The film was announced at Cannes Film Festival in 2002.

Wright said both that he suggested the film when in a cab with Pegg after the excitement of filming the zombie scene in Spaced, and while watching a horror film with both Pegg and Nick Frost. He began developing it in earnest after playing Resident Evil late one night himself, and going out in the early hours of the morning wondering what a British person's reaction to the zombie apocalypse would be. He considered the lack of firearms typical of American zombie movies, and his experience of the dazed early-morning walk to the shop turned into a scene in the film where Shaun does the same thing. Another influence from Wright's life came from how he missed the 2001 foot-and-mouth epidemic by simply not having paid attention to the news for a fortnight, turning his television on one day to see cattle being burnt, leaving him confused. Because of this, he said "it's plausible that the world could be ending and these two guys could be the last to know" as they also skip over the news on television in the film. The gag about Shaun and Ed spending all their time at the Winchester also comes from the actors' lives, as Pegg and Frost "always used to go to the same bar all the time", according to Wright, who had been trying to convince them not to.

The screenplay was written by Wright and Pegg in eight weeks. They were inspired by films including Night of the Living Dead (1968) and Dawn of the Dead (1978), as well as Raising Arizona (1987), Back to the Future (1985), Braindead (1992) and The Birds (1963). The actors met three weeks before filming began for read-throughs, where they also made changes to the script. According to Pegg, the script has a set structure, with certain lines and actions being repeated throughout the film, making improvisation harder. Only two scenes were improvised: when Ed begins to describe the people at the pub and when Shaun offers their associates some peanuts. Pegg said that the screenplay played well into being an actor in the film because he "could write to [his] own strengths" and create his own wish fulfilment.

Casting
The film's cast features a number of British comedians, comic actors, and sitcom stars, most prominently from Spaced, Black Books and The Office, and co-stars other actors from these same shows. Cast members from them include Pegg, Frost, Stevenson and Peter Serafinowicz. Frost met Pegg when he was working as a waiter, and was brought onto Spaced despite a lack of acting experience; Frost explained that Shaun and Ed have a dynamic similar to that of Simon and himself in real life, as they had been living together for years.

The production had originally approached Helen Mirren to play the part of Shaun's mother Barbara, which she turned down with a note that she would rather play other, funnier, characters. The role of Barbara went to Penelope Wilton. She was asked to take the role because of her work in the 1984 sitcom Ever Decreasing Circles. Shaun's stepfather is played by Bill Nighy, who accepted the role after Wright sent him an early script to read.

Cameos and extras
Secondary roles and cameos include Dylan Moran, Martin Freeman, Tamsin Greig, Julia Deakin and Reece Shearsmith. The voices of Mark Gatiss and Julia Davis can be heard as radio news presenters; Trisha Goddard also makes a cameo appearance, hosting two fictionalised episodes of her real-life talk show Trisha. Many other comics and comic actors appear in cameos as zombies, including Rob Brydon, Paul Putner, Pamela Kempthorne, Joe Cornish, Antonia Campbell-Hughes, Mark Donovan and Michael Smiley. Coldplay members Chris Martin and Jonny Buckland also have cameo roles in the film; Martin is a close friend of Pegg, who is the godfather of Martin's daughter, and also contributed to the soundtrack by guest singing the cover of Buzzcocks' "Everybody's Happy Nowadays" with Ash. He does not appear as a zombie, but as himself in a charity drive.

Zombie extras were recruited from Spaced fan communities. Wright said in 2020 that "[the] zombies spent a week cooped up on set. They had to stand outside The Winchester, the pub where our heroes take refuge, banging on the windows and not doing much else really. When we eventually involved them properly, they had this electric energy: a pure, crazed hysteria". Originally, there were 40 stunt performers hired to be the zombies, but the production realised that they would need a lot more to fill the set pieces. So many fans responded to the online call that auditions to select zombies were set up. There were 150 zombie extras until local children saw the zombie make-up and wanted to be involved, leading to another 50 child zombies being added.

Filming

The film was shot over nine weeks between May and July 2003. Wright uses in-camera transitions, typical to his style, to enable powerful visual storytelling. Pegg also commented on the use of a magical realism style, which he says is part of Wright's direction.

The production was filmed in London, on location and at Ealing Studios, and involved production companies Working Title and StudioCanal. Many exterior shots were filmed in and around the North London areas of Crouch End, Highgate, Finsbury Park and East Finchley. The electrical appliance shop that Shaun works at is a real shop located in North Finchley. The scenes filmed in and around the Winchester Tavern pub were shot at the Duke of Albany pub in New Cross, South London. A three-story Victorian pub, it was turned into flats in 2008.

Music
The film's score by Pete Woodhead and Daniel Mudford is a pastiche of Italian zombie film soundtracks by artists like Goblin and Fabio Frizzi. It also uses many musical cues from the original Dawn of the Dead that were originally taken by George A. Romero from the De Wolfe production music library. A friend of the assistant editor on the film had been compiling music library tracks from zombie films, making finding some music for the film much easier. Before production began on the film, Wright and Pegg had created a mixtape of songs they wanted to use. The Goblin music, though, was used as a temp track by Wright in editing; he liked the feel of it so much they decided to get the clearance to use it.

Bobby Olivier of Billboard attributes the initial rebirth of Queen's "Don't Stop Me Now" to its appearance in the film, which "introduced it to a new generation of listeners", saying: "Perhaps the most famous scene from Shaun of the Dead features "Don't Stop Me Now" which blares from a pub jukebox while stars Simon Pegg, Nick Frost and Kate Ashfield bash a zombie with pool cues to the song's hurtling beat". The moment had been Wright's idea, as he loves Queen and "had the idea of playing Don't Stop Me Now – one of the most positive, exciting, happy tunes ever – over a scene of extreme violence". Pegg explained that the fight in the pub was choreographed to the song even before it had been cleared to be used in the film, so they wrote to Brian May and begged to use it.

The other choreographed sequence, near the start of the film, used different music to that which it had been set to. The original was a Cornelius song, and had been the track written in for the scene from the screenplay. Wright then heard the song used in the film, by I Monster, when editing, and felt that it worked better. The tempo of both songs is the same, so the new song fit the original choreography.

Release

Marketing 
The film was distributed by United International Pictures (UIP) in the United Kingdom (UK) and Universal Pictures in the United States (US). UIP created a heavy targeted marketing strategy, including hiring actors to play zombies and dropping them around London to create disruption shortly before the film's release. This part of the campaign was run by ZenithOptimedia; their head said that "It has to be the most powerful way to communicate what Shaun of the Dead is all about".

Beyond traditional print advertising, posters were also placed in the London Underground. As the poster shows Shaun crammed tightly against windows surrounded by zombies, the company chose to buy up poster spaces that "would give the impression to anyone walking through the tunnels between platforms that the zombie carriages were on the tracks"; this is a tactic that UIP had not done before, but the creative angle of the posters' positioning naturally lent itself to such a move. A similar tactic was used with digital posters for the film at an international football match between England and Sweden; less-restrictive advertising laws in Sweden, where the game was held, meant that UIP had "hoardings incorporating flailing zombie-like arms", which would not have been permitted in England.

Box office 
In the UK, Shaun of the Dead took £1.6 million at 367 cinemas on its opening weekend (9–11 April 2004) and netted £6.4 million by mid-May. It was second at the box office, following 50 First Dates with £1.65 million. In its opening weekend in the US, Shaun of the Dead earned US$3.3 million, taking seventh place at the box office despite a limited release to 607 theatres. As of June 2020, the film has earned US$30,076,102 worldwide in box office receipts since its release. The film was released only two weeks after Zack Snyder's 2004 remake Dawn of the Dead. Both are internationally distributed by Universal Pictures, with the company only taking on Shaun of the Dead after setting the condition it be released after the remake.

Home media 
The film was released on VHS and DVD shortly after its theatrical run in the US, with a VHS and DVD release on 6 September 2004 in the UK and around December 2004 in the US, in widescreen-only for both formats. Features included several audio commentaries, EPK featurettes about the film's production, pre-production video diaries and concept videos, photo galleries, bloopers, and more. The film also saw release on the HD DVD format in 2007 and UMD, with a Blu-ray Disc release following in 2009.

The Blu-ray release had high-definition visuals and a 5.1 surround sound audio mix. Special features include four audio commentaries, the DVD features, and U-Control features giving access to "storyboards, missing bits, and of course the Zomb-O-Meter trivia track".

Comic adaptations and other media 

Pegg and Wright scripted a one-off tie-in comic strip for the British comic magazine 2000AD titled "There's Something About Mary". Set the day before the zombie outbreak, the strip follows and expands on the character of Mary, who appears briefly in the introductory credits and is the first zombie whom Shaun and Ed are aware of; the strip details how she became a zombie. The strip was made available on the DVD release of Shaun, along with two other strips that wrapped up "plot holes" in the film, like how Dianne escaped and survived the Winchester incident, and Ed's fate after taking refuge in the pub's basement. The comics, which feature Pegg and Wright's voices on the DVD and are in black and white, were drawn by Oscar Wright, a graphic artist and Edgar Wright's brother. In 2005, IDW Publishing released a four-issue adaptation written by Chris Ryall (with input from Edgar Wright & Simon Pegg) and drawn by Zack Howard. The comic also contains scenes that were left out of the movie.

In 2006, the National Entertainment Collectibles Association announced that it would be producing action figures based on the film. Upper Deck Entertainment released a card for the popular World of Warcraft TCG in 2007, an ally named "Shawn of the Dead", with the power of bringing back allies from the enemy graveyard. Pegg and Frost reprised their roles as Shaun and Ed for a public service announcement video, The Plan, released on 19 March 2020 on YouTube. Shaun and Ed share advice about the ongoing COVID-19 pandemic, with Shaun urging Ed to follow National Health Service guidelines, stay home, and avoid the pub.

Cultural references

The film contains many references to Romero's films Night of the Living Dead, Dawn of the Dead, and Day of the Dead, with Dawn in particular being referenced. The name Shaun of the Dead was intended to be a pun on Dawn of the Dead. A hand-in-mouth theoretical sequel called From Dusk Till Shaun was discussed by Wright and Pegg as "pub talk", referencing From Dusk till Dawn, as was a parallel sequel starring Stevenson called Yvonne of the Dead. A poster was made for From Dusk Till Shaun to feature in the alternate universe Times Square in the 2018 animated Sony Pictures Marvel Comics movie Spider-Man: Into the Spider-Verse; a co-director of this film, Rodney Rothman, had reached out to Wright to ask for a movie suggestion that he could have theoretically made in the alternate universe.

Other zombie film references include one to 28 Days Later, made during the ending scene when Shaun and Liz are watching television and a news report mentions the idea of "raging infected monkeys" – in 28 Days Later the rage virus was started by monkeys in a laboratory – and one to Italian gore director Lucio Fulci with the restaurant called "Fulci's". The film was the first of the Three Flavours Cornetto trilogy, in which each film makes a reference to a different flavour of Cornetto ice cream. Shaun of the Dead features red strawberry-flavoured ice cream, signifying blood. The Cornetto was included as Ed's hangover cure because it is Wright's actual hangover cure.

Wright and Pegg had contacted various artists to ask for use of their records in the famed scene where Shaun and Ed throw LPs at a zombie to defend themselves. While some artists never got back, Wright said that "Sade was the coolest. She said we could trash Diamond Life without hesitation". Wright would later include a Sade song in the soundtrack of his 2010 film Scott Pilgrim vs. the World – the Beachwood Sparks version of "By Your Side". It was on an original list of songs for the Scott Pilgrim graphic novel, and Wright joked that he owed Sade "some publishing money" after destroying the album in Shaun of the Dead. Of the moment, Pegg said that they "love using Sade as a weapon", noting that she was one of only two artists who gave permission to show cover art in the scene (the other being New Order).

Besides the short The Plan made during the 2020 COVID-19 pandemic, the film saw renewed interest in this time as an Internet meme. It began trending on Twitter because the film's poster, showing zombies pressed up against door windows, bears a striking resemblance to a photojournalist's image of protesters in Ohio at the Statehouse demanding lockdown be lifted. The situation was also described as "reminiscent of some of the scenes towards the end of the movie". The photojournalist was Joshua A. Bickel, who said that he "thought the windows and door were an interesting compositional element"; Dawn of the Dead prosthetist Tom Savini said it reminds him of Shaun of the Dead because both use the pressed-up-against-glass horror trope.

The film also has tribute with a zombie hand sculpture at the Hakone Museum in Japan, where it is a cult hit; it did not see a theatrical release in the country until March 2019.

Films that have been based on or inspired by Shaun of the Dead include Juan of the Dead, Hsien of the Dead, and Shed of the Dead.

Analysis
Film scholar Kyle Bishop, Literature scholar and leading zombie film researcher Peter Dendle, and Sci-Fi scholar Gerry Canavan all comment on Shaun of the Dead as part of a large body of zombie narratives produced in the wake of 9/11. Bishop explained that the "renaissance of the subgenre reveals a connection between zombie cinema and post-9/11 cultural consciousness", because "horror films function as barometers of society's anxieties, and zombie movies represent the inescapable realities of unnatural death while presenting a grim view of the modern apocalypse". He finds that the subgenre of zombie films "can shock and terrify a population that has become numb to other horror subgenres", with Dendle similarly assessing that "the possibility of wide-scale destruction and devastation which 9/11 brought once again into the communal consciousness found a ready narrative expression in the zombie apocalypses which over thirty years had honed images of desperation subsistence and amoral survivalism to a fine edge".

Dirk Eitzen also examined the film in depth as an example of how comedy is made in film, particularly how interpretive humour and satire are used. For example, when Shaun slips and falls in the shop in the opening sequence, per Eitzen's explanation, it is funny on several levels. Falling is funny; not noticing the zombie apocalypse is funny; the social satire that contrasts Shaun's mindless behaviour with the mindless zombies is funny; and the self-reference to where Shaun had slipped on a curb earlier in the sequence is funny, too. Media scholar Lindsey Decker wrote on how the film created comedy through transnational generic hybridisation, taking cues from American zombie movies as well as "British comedic practices from WWII-era Ealing comedies, television two-man comedy teams and the Monty Python sketch troupe". In this use of British comedy within an American genre, it also serves as commentary on British-American relations in the film industry.

Multiple chapters of the 2016 book The Laughing Dead: The Horror-Comedy Film from Bride of Frankenstein to Zombieland are devoted to analysing aspects of Shaun of the Dead. Steven Webley's chapter looks at the use of the Uncanny in the film, while Shelley S. Rees' chapter discusses the film's Marxist implications and the transgressive nature of zombies and zombie films in terms of relationships and sexuality. Comparatively, Kathryn A. Cady and Thomas Oates write in their article 'Family Splatters: Rescuing Heteronormativity from the Zombie Apocalypse' that the film "imagines a single-generation heteronormative family as the outcome of zombie invasion".

Beyond film studies, a Bayesian mathematical model using Markov chain Monte Carlo methods was performed on examples of epidemic progression by Caitlyn Witkowski and Brian Blais in 2013. As an example of how such modelling could be applied to infectious disease control, Witkowski and Blais took examples of zombie apocalypses in Romero's original Dead trilogy and Shaun of the Dead to demonstrate disease dynamics.

Reception

Critical response 

Shaun of the Dead received critical acclaim. On Rotten Tomatoes, the film has a score of 92%, based on 213 reviews, with an average rating of 7.80/10. The site's critical consensus reads, "Shaun of the Dead cleverly balances scares and witty satire, making for a bloody good zombie movie with loads of wit". On Metacritic, the film has a score of 76 out of 100, based on 34 critics, indicating "generally favorable reviews". Nev Pierce, reviewing the film for the BBC, called it a "side-splitting, head-smashing, gloriously gory horror comedy" that will "amuse casual viewers and delight genre fans".  Peter Bradshaw gave it four stars out of five, saying it "boasts a script crammed with real gags" and is "pacily directed [and] nicely acted". Wendy Ide for Screen Daily wrote that the film "proves that the move from small to big screen comedy does not always end in artistic failure", saying that the film stays true to Pegg and Wright's style but also makes use of comedy more accessible to the British masses than that of Spaced.

Pierce felt that the choice of weapons was amusing, and suggested that the film's real strength was the characterisation of the unhappy leads, but also wrote that the climax at the pub was lacking in horror and comedy compared to the rest of the film. Like Pierce, Ide felt that there is "a convincing emotional depth" despite the comedy; she similarly noted that the second half was slower, but chalked this up to being darker in tone at the climax. She praised the special effects make-up and prosthetics created by Stuart Conran. Keith Phipps of The A.V. Club enjoyed the record-throwing scene, citing it as an example of where the film "doesn't mind putting in extra work for its laughs", as it comes off funnier with Shaun and Ed debating which records they sacrifice rather than throwing indiscriminately. He found Wright's technical skills to be impressive, adding that Wright left the spotlight to the performances rather than the camerawork, but found the finale to be disappointingly played straight.

Both the American critics Roger Ebert and Robert K. Elder said that the film brought something more to the zombie genre. Ebert wrote that he was "by now more or less exhausted by the cinematic possibilities of killing [zombies]", and so he was glad for what Shaun of the Dead brought to the table outside of this, writing that "instead of focusing on the Undead and trying to get the laughs there, it treats the living characters as sitcom regulars whose conflicts and arguments keep getting interrupted by annoying flesh-eaters". Elder agreed that by its release the zombie movie had "ambled its course", but thought that "Shaun of the Dead stands on its own, a romantic comedy crossed with a quarter-life crisis drama–just played against a background horde of brain-hungry, decomposing undead". B. Alan Orange of MovieWeb wrote that "The British Zombie experience "is" different enough to change the outlook of a whole genre".

Of the cast, Ebert particularly praised Nighy, writing that "there's something endearing about his response ["I ran it under the tap"] when he is bitten by a zombie". Elder described Nighy as the film's scene stealer.

Peter Travers also gave the film three out of four stars, and praised Pegg: "[he] makes you root for Shaun, even when he’s slacking with Ed [...], neglecting Liz and battling with his mum". Phipps' take on Shaun was that "Pegg gives his hero a defeated look that slowly melts away as the crisis at last gives him a chance to become a man of action".

Accolades

Best-of lists and appraisal 
In 2004, Total Film magazine named Shaun of the Dead the 49th greatest British film of all time. In 2006, it was rated as the third greatest comedy film of all time in the Channel 4 list of the 50 Greatest Comedy Films, with only Monty Python's Life of Brian and Airplane! ranked higher. In 2007, Stylus Magazine named it the ninth-greatest zombie film ever made. In 2007, Time named it one of the 25 best horror films, calling the film "spooky, silly and smart-smart-smart" and complimenting its director: "Wright, who'd be a director to watch in any genre, plays world-class games with the camera and the viewer's expectations of what's supposed to happen in a scare film". Bloody Disgusting ranked the film second in their list of the 'Top 20 Horror Films of the Decade', with the article saying "Shaun of the Dead isn't just the best horror-comedy of the decade – it's quite possibly the best horror-comedy ever made". In December 2009, Now deemed Shaun of the Dead the best film of the decade. In March 2011, the film was voted by BBC Radio 1 and BBC Radio 1Xtra listeners as their second favourite film of all time. Frank Darabont's The Shawshank Redemption came in first place. In 2008, Empire magazine named it as one of the Top 500 films, for which a new release poster was made for the film, and in 2016 Empire ranked it 6th on their list of the 100 best British films, with their entry stating, "it's a masterpiece, right up there with Evil Dead II as one of the finest horror/comedies ever made".

George A. Romero first saw the film after Wright called to ask him what he thought; he watched it in a cinema in Florida by himself, and called them to give his approval. He was so impressed with Pegg and Wright's work that he asked them to appear in cameo roles in the 2005 film Land of the Dead. Pegg and Wright insisted on being zombies rather than the slightly more noticeable roles that were originally offered. Pegg and Frost reprised their roles (in animation) in the Phineas and Ferb Halloween special "Night of the Living Pharmacists" in October 2014. Quentin Tarantino described the film as one of his top twenty favourite films made since 1992, and horror novelist Stephen King described it as "a '10' on the fun meter and destined to be a cult classic". It has a cult following, generally among "millennial comedy and horror lovers alike".

References

External links 

 
 
 
 

Living Dead films
2004 films
2004 black comedy films
2004 comedy horror films
2004 directorial debut films
2000s buddy comedy films
2000s English-language films
2000s monster movies
Apocalyptic films
Big Talk Productions films
British black comedy films
British buddy comedy films
British zombie comedy films
Films directed by Edgar Wright
American supernatural horror films
Films set in London
Films shot in London
Films with screenplays by Edgar Wright
Films with screenplays by Simon Pegg
Postmodern films
Rogue (company) films
2000s American films
2000s British films